The Central Maluku languages are a proposed subgroup of the Central–Eastern Malayo-Polynesian branch of the Austronesian language family which comprises around fifty languages spoken principally on the Seram, Buru, Ambon, Kei, and the Sula Islands. None of the languages have as many as fifty thousand speakers, and several are extinct.

Classification
The traditional components of Central Maluku are the Sula, Buru, and East Central Maluku languages, plus the Ambelau isolate.

Collins (1983)
The following classification of the Central Maluku languages below is from Collins (1983:20, 22) and (1986).

West Central Maluku
Ambelau
Buru–Sula–Taliabo
Buru: Buru, Lisela, Palumata (extinct), Moksela (extinct)
Sula: Sula, Mangole
Taliabo (Kadai, Padang/Samala, Mananga, Mangei/Soboyo)

East Central Maluku (around Seram and Aru)
Banda–Geser
Banda
Geser: Bati, Geser, Watubela
East Seram
Bobot–Masiwang
Setic: Hoti, Benggoi, Salas, Liana-Seti
Nunusaku
Kayeli
Patakai–Manusela 
Nuaulu
Huaulu, Manusela
Three Rivers
Wemale
Amalumute
Yalahatan
Northwest Seram:  Hulung, Saleman, Loun, Ulat Inai (Alune, Naka'ela), Lisabata-Nuniali
Piru Bay languages (20 languages)

References

 
Central Malayo-Polynesian languages
C